Sugandha Garg is an Indian actress, singer and television host. She was last seen in Indian web series Guilty Minds.

Career
Garg appeared as Shaleen in the film Jaane Tu... Ya Jaane Na (2008). She played the role of the best friend to Gayatri Patel in the movie Let's Dance, released on 19 June 2009, and appeared as a student reporter in My Name Is Khan. She has played a major role of Zoya the makeup artist in Tere Bin Laden, released on 16 July 2010. She also worked as a call center employee in the British comedy Mumbai Calling (7 epi) in 2009. In 2012 the actress was seen in film Patang.

Her upcoming films include Santosh Sivan's Ceylon, Shefali Bushan's Jugni, the sequel of Tere Bin Laden  and Manu Warrier's Coffee Bloom. In Ceylon (Inam in Tamil), she has played the role of a Sri Lankan refugee. About her performance in the film, Sivan stated that "nobody could have done what she has done here".

Garg has worked in television and hosted several shows and has been linked to many television personalities. She first hosted the show Haath Se Haath Mila for BBC when she was 18. She later hosted the shows Whats with Indian men along with Indrani Dasgupta and It happens only in India on Fox Traveller. She has also performed in theatre plays I Have Gone Marking and Sometimes. She performed the Assamese song "Tokari" with Papon in Coke Studio @ MTV, Season 2.

Personal life

Garg graduated from Maitreyi College, Delhi University. Garg married Raghu Ram, a television producer and MTV Reality Show Host in 2006.  They have been officially divorced as on 30 Jan 2018.

Filmography

Films

Web series

References

External links
 
 
 

Actresses in Hindi cinema
Indian film actresses
Living people
Actresses from Hyderabad, India
Year of birth missing (living people)
21st-century Indian actresses
Delhi University alumni